The 158th New York State Legislature, consisting of the New York State Senate and the New York State Assembly, met from January 2 to April 17, 1935, during the third year of Herbert H. Lehman's governorship, in Albany.

Background
Under the provisions of the New York Constitution of 1894, re-apportioned in 1917, 51 Senators and 150 assemblymen were elected in single-seat districts; senators for a two-year term, assemblymen for a one-year term. The senatorial districts consisted either of one or more entire counties; or a contiguous area within a single county. The counties which were divided into more than one senatorial district were New York (nine districts), Kings (eight), Bronx (three), Erie (three), Monroe (two), Queens (two) and Westchester (two). The Assembly districts were made up of contiguous area, all within the same county.

At this time there were two major political parties: the Democratic Party and the Republican Party. The Socialist Party, the Communist Party and the Socialist Labor Party also nominated tickets. The Prohibition Party ran for the last time under the name of Law Preservation Party. In New York City, the "Recovery Party", the "City Fusion Party" and several other minor parties also nominated tickets.

Elections
The New York state election, 1934, was held on November 6. Governor Herbert H. Lehman and Lieutenant Governor M. William Bray were re-elected, both Democrats. Of the other eight statewide elective offices, six were carried by Democrats, one by the Republican chief judge with Democratic endorsement, and one by a Republican judge who ran on the Democratic ticket only. The approximate party strength at this election, as expressed by the vote for Governor, was: Democrats 2,202,000; Republicans 1,394,000; Socialists 127,000; Communists 46,000; Law Preservation 20,500; and Socialist Labor 7,000.

For the first time there were three women in the Legislature: Ex-Assemblywoman Rhoda Fox Graves (Rep.), of Gouverneur, a former school teacher who after her marriage became active in women's organisations and politics, was the first woman elected to the State Senate; Assemblywoman Doris I. Byrne (Dem.), a lawyer from the Bronx, was re-elected; and Jane H. Todd (Rep.), of Tarrytown, was also elected to the Assembly.

For the first time since 1913, Democratic majorities were elected to both Houses of the Legislature. It remained the only time until 1965.

Sessions
The Legislature met for the regular session at the State Capitol in Albany on January 2, 1935; and adjourned on April 17.

Irwin Steingut (Dem.) was elected Speaker.

John J. Dunnigan (Dem.) as re-elected Temporary President of the State Senate.

On April 16, the Legislature passed a bill making nudism a misdemeanor.

State Senate

Districts

Members
The asterisk (*) denotes members of the previous Legislature who continued in office as members of this Legislature. Edward J. Coughlin, Martin W. Deyo and George B. Kelly changed from the Assembly to the Senate.

Note: For brevity, the chairmanships omit the words "...the Committee on (the)..."

Employees
 Clerk: James J. Reilly

State Assembly

Assemblymen

Note: For brevity, the chairmanships omit the words "...the Committee on (the)..."

Employees
 Clerk: Homer W. Storey

Notes

Sources
 Members of the New York Senate (1930s) at Political Graveyard
 Members of the New York Assembly (1930s) at Political Graveyard
 IVES IS ELECTED MINORITY LEADER in the Daily Sentinel, of Rome, on January 2, 1935
 CHAIRMAN OF CHOICE POST in the Plattsburgh Daily Republican, of Plattsburgh, on January 8, 1935

158
1935 in New York (state)
1935 U.S. legislative sessions